Lawrence McKillip (July 25, 1924 – October 19, 1986) was an American bobsledder. He competed at the 1956 Winter Olympics and the 1964 Winter Olympics.

References

1924 births
1986 deaths
American male bobsledders
Olympic bobsledders of the United States
Bobsledders at the 1956 Winter Olympics
Bobsledders at the 1964 Winter Olympics
People from Saranac Lake, New York